The Church of Jesus Christ of Latter-day Saints in Kentucky refers to the Church of Jesus Christ of Latter-day Saints (LDS Church) and its members in Kentucky. The first small branch was established in 1834. It has since grown to 37,077 members in 83 congregations.

Official church membership as a percentage of general population was 0.77% in 2014. According to the 2014 Pew Forum on Religion & Public Life survey, less than 1% of Kentuckians self-identify themselves most closely with The Church of Jesus Christ of Latter-day Saints. The LDS Church is the 8th largest denomination in Kentucky.

Stakes are located in Crestwood, Elizabethtown, Hopkinsville, Lexington (2), Louisville, and Paducah.

History

In 1835, two missionaries baptized 22 people and the first group of Kentucky Saints left for Missouri in September 1836.

In 2011, Lexington native Rob Hymas, became an area seventy and oversaw 10 stake presidents in Kentucky and Tennessee.

Stakes
As of February 2023, there were 8 stakes with their stake center located in Kentucky.

Stakes with congregations in Kentucky are as follows:

Mission
The East Central States Mission was created on December 9, 1928 which took in portions of what was previously Southern States Mission and Eastern States Mission. Kentucky itself was previously in the Southern States Mission. On June 10, 1970, it was renamed the Kentucky-Tennessee Mission. On June 20, 1974, it was renamed the Kentucky Louisville Mission.

Temples

The Louisville Kentucky Temple was dedicated on March 19, 2000 by President Thomas S. Monson.

See also

The Church of Jesus Christ of Latter-day Saints membership statistics (United States)

References

External links
 Newsroom (Kentucky)
 ComeUntoChrist.org Latter-day Saints Visitor site
 The Church of Jesus Christ of Latter-day Saints Official site

 
Kentucky